Rachel Porter may refer to:

Rachel Porter, fictional character in Paycheck (film)
Rachel Matheson née Porter, fictional character in the TV series Revolution
Rachel Porter, fictional character in Fatal Deception: Mrs. Lee Harvey Oswald